The Army Fire Service (AFS), later called the Army Department Fire Service, was the fire service which performed firefighting duties on British Army camps. Its personnel were largely soldiers until 1959, when the fire service was civilianised. Until 1965 it was administratively part of the Royal Army Service Corps but under the McLeod Reorganisation of Army Logistics it was transferred to Royal Army Ordnance Corps sponsorship.  Under both corps it was semi-autonomous and had its own insignia, such as cap badge and stable belt.

The Army Department Fire Service later amalgamated into the Ministry of Defence Fire Service.

Defunct fire and rescue services of the United Kingdom
British administrative corps